Qiqiharnan (South) railway station is a railway station of the Harbin–Qiqihar Intercity Railway and located in Longsha District, Qiqihar, Heilongjiang, China. It is 6.5 km from central Qiqihar Railway Station and 282 km from the provincial capital of Harbin. It is divided into high-speed (Platforms 1-9) and conventional rail sections (Platforms 10-12 are reserved).Construction was started on July 5, 2013.

Station Layout
Qiqihar South Railway Station has a building area of 67,962 square metres, of which 29,957 square meters is for the waiting hall. The design of the station follows modern Chinese practice for high-speed railway stations with an underground arrivals floor, ground floor (platform level), with passengers going up to a large waiting hall spanning above across all the platforms. It is designed to handle 6,000 people arriving and departing at any one time.

See also
 Qiqihar railway station

External links

Railway stations in Heilongjiang
Stations on the Harbin–Qiqihar Intercity Railway